Richard Coates (1889 – 1960) was an English footballer who played for Stoke.

Career
Coates was born in Stoke-upon-Trent and played amateur football with Welsh club Mardy before joining Stoke in 1912. He played in one first team match which came in a 1–0 defeat to Coventry City during the 1912–13 season before returning to amateur football with Annfield Plain.

Career statistics

References

1889 births
1960 deaths
Footballers from Stoke-on-Trent
English footballers
Association football forwards
Mardy A.F.C. players
Stoke City F.C. players
Annfield Plain F.C. players